The 2013 European Juniors Wrestling Championships was held in Skopje, North Macedonia between July 2–7, 2013.

Medal table

Team ranking

Medal summary

Men's freestyle

Men's Greco-Roman

Women's freestyle

References

External links
Official website

Wrestling
European Wrestling Juniors Championships
Sports competitions in Skopje